Yapıntı is a village in Mut district of Mersin Province, Turkey. Population of Yapıntı was 1059. as of 2012.

References

Villages in Mut District